Steindalen is a neighbourhood in the city of Kristiansand in Agder county, Norway. The neighborhood is located in the borough of Vågsbygd and in the district of Voiebyen. Steindalen is north of Kroodden, south of Voieåsen, east of Voietun, and west of Møviklia.

Transport

References

Geography of Kristiansand
Neighbourhoods of Kristiansand